Open is the third studio album by the progressive rock band Stick Men. The members for this release were Pat Mastelotto, Tony Levin and Markus Reuter. It was released 1 June 2012. It's the group's first all-instrumental release, built around group improvisations instead of pre-composed pieces.

Track listing 
 "Amino 21" (5:57)
 "Open Pt. 1 - Plunge" (2:19)
 "Alabaster" (12:05)
 "Open Pt. 2 - Plow" (4:42)
 "Cyber Shards" (12:33)
 "Open Pt. 3 - Truncheon" (4:14)
 "Glass Heart (for Renée)" (7:28)
 "Time Capsule" (9:54)

Personnel
 Pat Mastelotto − Traps & Buttons
 Tony Levin − Chapman Stick
 Markus Reuter − Touch Guitars U8 & Electronics

References

2012 albums
Tony Levin albums